DXFC (91.1 FM) was a radio station formerly owned and operated by Bombo Radyo Philippines through its licensee Newsounds Broadcasting Network, Inc. It was formerly known as Star FM from 1996 to 2005, when it went off the air. The frequency is currently used by Tacurong-based Max FM and General Santos-based Pacman Radio.

References

Radio stations in South Cotabato
Radio stations established in 1996
Radio stations disestablished in 2005
Defunct radio stations in the Philippines